Endmoor is a small village within Cumbria, England, situated close to the A65 road.

Endmoor is a community with small businesses including a shop, club inn, village school, village hall and bakery. A millennium clock stands on the green and there is a playground for the children.

History 
Endmoor used to be home to a grand manor house called Enyeat. This is now the name of a nearby road and the coach house (1875) is a guest house. In 1991 the new primary school "St.Patrick's C of E School" was built by locals. It is now 'the hub' of the village offering a pre-school, parent and toddler group, parent and child activities and adult / community classes such as Art & IT.

The old school, opened in 1862, has been turned into housing. It was replaced by a new school in 1991.

Local schools 

Nearby secondary schools include Dallam School in Milnthorpe and Queen Elizabeth School in Kirkby Lonsdale.

See also

Listed buildings in Preston Richard

References

External links

 Cumbria County History Trust: Preston Richard (nb: provisional research only – see Talk page)
 http://www.thecumbriadirectory.com/Town_or_Village/location.php?url=endmoor

Villages in Cumbria
South Lakeland District